Nicole D. Peeler (born August 24, 1978) is an American author and educator, who wrote the Jane True – Tempest urban fantasy series.

Biography
Nicole Peeler has a B.A. in English Literature, Magna Cum Laude from Boston University and a Ph.D. in English Literature from the University of Edinburgh. She was an Assistant Professor of English Literature at the Louisiana State University in Shreveport. Currently, she is teaching in Greensburg, Pennsylvania at Seton Hill University.

Bibliography

Jane True series
 Tempest Rising, Orbit, November 1, 2009, 
 Tracking the Tempest, Orbit, July 1, 2010, 
 Tempest’s Legacy, Orbit, January 3, 2011, 
 Eye of the Tempest, Orbit, August 1, 2011, 
 Tempest's Fury, Orbit, June 26, 2012, 
 Tempest Reborn, Orbit, May 28, 2013, 
 Something Wikkid This Way Comes: A Jane True Novella, Orbit, January 17, 2012
 The Hound of Bar Harborville (A Jane True Short Story), October 13, 2014
 The Ryu Morgue (A Jane True Short Story), December 16, 2014
 Carniepunk: The Inside Man, Simon & Schuster, January 12, 2015
 Basic Incubus (A Jane True Short Story), February 17, 2015

Other novels
 Jinn and Juice, Orbit, April 7, 2015,

Short stories
 "Borderline Dead" from Dead But Not Forgotten, Penguin Books, November 5, 2014

References

External links
 Nicole Peeler's official website 

21st-century American novelists
American fantasy writers
American women novelists
1978 births
Living people
Women science fiction and fantasy writers
21st-century American women writers
Alumni of the University of Edinburgh